Tall Asur, known in Hebrew as Ba'al Hazor, is a hill and one of the highest points in the West Bank, with an altitude of 1,016 metres (3,333 ft). It is surrounded by the Palestinian villages of Silwad, Taybeh, Kafr Malik and Al-Mazra'a ash-Sharqiya and the Israeli settlement of Ofra.

If that is correct, the modern Arabic place name preserves the original Biblical name.

The mountain has two peaks, one of which is an IDF base.

See also
 Geography of the Palestinian territories
 Geography of the West Bank
 Mount Nabi Yunis, the highest point of the Palestinian territories

Sources

 Tall Asur - Peakbagger.com. Retrieved on 2011-02-04.

References 
Abraham
Hebrew Bible mountains
Mountains of the West Bank